Mister Myanmar is a men's pageant held in Myanmar. The winner and finalists from the contest go on to represent Myanmar in many international pageants.

Titleholders

International Pageants 
Color key
  : Declared as Winner
  : Ended as runner-up or top 5/6 qualification
  : Ended as one of the finalists or semifinalists
  : Ended as special awards winner

Manhunt International

Mister World

Mister International

Mister Supranational

Mister Global

Man of the World

Other Franchises

Man of the Year

Mister Tourism and Culture Universe

Mister Grand International

Mister Friendship International

Mister Universe Tourism

Mister Model Worldwide

Mister National Universe

Mister Ocean

Mister Tourism Globe

Mister Tourism World

Mister United World

Mister Continental International

Mister Universal Ambassador

Mister Model of the World

Altitude Men International

Mister Altitude World

Mister United Continents

Mister Universe Tourism

Mister Global Teen

Prince & Princess International

Mister Asian International

Mister Culture World

Mister Asia

Mr Gay World

See also 
 Miss Burma (1947–1962)
 Miss Universe Myanmar
 Miss World Myanmar
 Miss International Myanmar
 Miss Earth Myanmar
 Miss Supranational Myanmar
 Miss Grand Myanmar

References

External links

Myanmar
Beauty pageants in Myanmar
Man of the World (pageant)
Mister Global by country